The 2022 IIHF World Championship was hosted by Finland from 13 to 29 May 2022, as the International Ice Hockey Federation (IIHF) announced on 19 May 2017 in Cologne, Germany. The host cities of the World Championships were Tampere and Helsinki, of which Tampere's brand-new Nokia Arena served as the main venue of the games.

Since all lower divisions of the 2021 Men's Ice Hockey World Championships were cancelled due to the COVID-19 pandemic, all 16 teams from the previous year's top division were set to return this year. However, in the midst of the 2022 Russian invasion of Ukraine, Russia and Belarus were suspended from competing in all IIHF tournaments for at least a year. This marked the first time that Russia missed the top division of the World Championship since the dissolution of the Soviet Union. For this tournament, the suspended nations were replaced by Austria and France, the two highest-ranked teams in 2021 that had not already qualified. Additionally, the venue in Helsinki was moved from Helsinki Halli, previously known as Hartwall Arena, to Helsinki Ice Hall due to the former being owned by Russian oligarchs.

Finland defeated Canada 4–3 in overtime in the gold medal game for their fourth title and their first medal ever won on home ice. This marked the first time since the introduction of the playoff round in 1992 that the same two teams met in the gold medal game three tournaments in a row. Czechia won the bronze medal, their first medal since 2012, after an 8–4 win over the United States.

The tournament saw multiple historic upsets: Austria's first victory against Czechia, and Denmark's first victory against Canada. In addition, it suffered from the lowest attendance in two decades, excluding the 2021 tournament played without audience; some attribute this to the absence of Russia.

Venues

Participants

Qualified as host

Automatic qualifiers after the cancellation of the 2021 IIHF lower division championships
 (expelled)2

1 (expelled)2

Qualifiers after Russia and Belarus were expelled
3
3
1 Pursuant to a December 2020 ruling by the Court of Arbitration for Sport on doping sanctions, Russian athletes and teams were prohibited from competing under the Russian flag or using the Russian national anthem at any Olympic Games or world championships through 16 December 2022, and could only compete as "neutral athlete[s]." For IIHF tournaments, the Russian team was to play under the name "ROC". Instead of the Russian national anthem being played at the 2021 World Championship, Piano Concerto No.1 by Pyotr Ilyich Tchaikovsky was to be played.2 However, on 28 February 2022, the IIHF decided to expel ROC and Belarus from the tournament due to the Russian invasion of Ukraine.
3 Austria and France replaced Russia and Belarus.

Seeding
The seedings in the preliminary round are based on the 2021 IIHF World Ranking, as of the end of the 2021 IIHF World Championship, using the serpentine system while allowing the organizer, "to allocate a maximum of two teams to separate groups".

Group A (Helsinki)
 (1)
 (3)
 (5)
 (8)
 (9)
 (12)
 (13)
 (17)
 (replaces ROC) (15)

Group B (Tampere)
 (2)
 (4)
 (6)
 (7)
 (10)
 (11)
 (14)
 (16)
 (replaces Belarus) (18)

Rosters

Each team's roster consisted of at least 15 skaters (forwards, and defencemen) and 2 goaltenders, and at most 25 skaters and 3 goaltenders. All 16 participating nations, through the confirmation of their respective national associations, had to submit a "Long List" no later than two weeks before the tournament, and a final roster by the Passport Control meeting prior to the start of the tournament.

Match officials

16 referees and linesmen were announced on 12 May 2022.

Preliminary round
The groups were announced on 7 June 2021, with the schedule being revealed on 18 August 2021.

Group A

Group B

Playoff round

Final standings

Statistics

Scoring leaders
List shows the top skaters sorted by points, then goals.

GP = Games played; G = Goals; A = Assists; Pts = Points; +/− = Plus/Minus; PIM = Penalties in Minutes; POS = Position
Source: IIHF.com

Goaltending leaders
Only the top five goaltenders, based on save percentage, who have played at least 40% of their team's minutes, are included in this list.

TOI = time on ice (minutes:seconds); SA = shots against; GA = goals against; GAA = goals against average; Sv% = save percentage; SO = shutouts
Source: IIHF.com

Awards
The awards were announced on 29 May 2022.

Individual awards

Media All Stars

References

External links
Official website

 
2022 Men
2022 IIHF Men's World Ice Hockey Championships
International ice hockey competitions hosted by Finland
2022 in ice hockey
2022 in Finnish sport
International sports competitions in Helsinki
Sports competitions in Tampere
May 2022 sports events in Finland
2020s in Helsinki
Sports events affected by the 2022 Russian invasion of Ukraine